Vue De Lac (French for "View of Lake") is a complex of three towers in Jumeirah Lake Towers in Dubai, United Arab Emirates.  Two of the towers, Vue De Lac 1 and Vista Del Lago, have 40 floors.  Vue De Lac 2 has 45 floors.  Completion of the complex was initially promised for September 2007.  In 2009 a group of 30 investors filed a case with RERA against delays in construction and changes to design plans.  An official from Al Attar Properties responded that the changes were due to regulation changes and that refunds would not be considered.  In early 2010 Al Attar Properties started chasing investors for $18.5 million, despite the development still not being completed.

Al Attar Properties has been subject of extensive lawsuits by the investors.  As of 2011 main construction work had still not commenced on the development.

The development featured on an episode of Homes from Hell on ITV1 in July 2010.

Other projects by the same developer include: Global Point, Polaris, Skyscraper, Toronto tower, Vancouver Tower. Toronto and Vancouver towers were cancelled by Dubai RERA. 
- Vue De Lac
- Vista De Lago 

Toronto and Vancouver tower projects by Al Attar Properties were cancelled and lands were sold through auction.

See also
 List of tallest buildings in Dubai

References

External links
 http://www.mothers-story.com/
Vue De Lac on Emporis.com
Vue De Lac on Al Attar Group website

Al Attar Properties in Dubai
By Anjana Kumar (Gulf News, June 17, 2015) : 
 http://gulfnews.com/xpress/dubai/news/investor-seeks-refund-for-cancelled-project-1.1536890

Proposed skyscrapers in Dubai
Unbuilt buildings and structures in the United Arab Emirates